The New Caledonia women's national football team represents New Caledonia in international women's football. The team is controlled by the Fédération Calédonienne de Football.

Results and fixtures

The following is a list of match results in the last 12 months, as well as any future matches that have been scheduled.

Legend

2022

Coaching staff

Players

Current squad
The following players were called up for the 2019 Pacific Games from 7–20 July in Apia, Samoa.

Caps and goals updated as of 18 July 2019, after the game against Samoa.

Recent call-ups
The following players have been named to the New Caledonia squad in the last 12 months.

Previous squads

OFC Women's Nations Cup
2018 OFC Women's Nations Cup – New Caledonia

Competitive record

OFC Women's Nations Cup

*Draws include knockout matches decided on penalty kicks.

Pacific Games

See also

Sport in New Caledonia
Football in New Caledonia
Women's football in New Caledonia
New Caledonia men's national football team

References

External links
Official website, FedCalFoot.com 

 
Oceanian women's national association football teams